Londonderry High School (LHS) is a public secondary school serving grades 9 through 12 in the town of Londonderry, New Hampshire, United States. It is the sole secondary school in the Londonderry School District. It was constructed in 1972 as a junior high school and adopted its current role in 1982.

The school's campus is on a  parcel of land in the center of town off of Mammoth Road (New Hampshire Route 128). The current capacity is 2100 students; 1521  are enrolled.

The school is known for its large touring marching band. Its athletics teams compete as the Lancers.

History
The original building was constructed in 1972 as a junior high school.  In 1978, the town voted to create a separate high school for the town's students, instead of sending them to Pinkerton Academy in Derry, and Memorial High School in Manchester. The building then became a combination Junior/Senior High School.  In 1982, a new junior high school was built nearby, and the original building adopted its current ninth through twelfth grade system. The school has received several additions, including a separate two-story gymnasium which opened in January 2003.

Campus

Demographics

Administration

School district
Londonderry High School is the only high school in the Londonderry School District under the authority of School Administrative Unit (SAU) #12 of New Hampshire.  The interim district superintendent is Dan Black.

House system
Londonderry High School is administered through a house system, comprising four houses organized by last name. Each assistant principal is in charge of one house; however, they all help with the day-to-day running of the school.

In-school administrators
The principal of the school is Jason Parent. Assistant Principals are Abbey Sloper, Ryan O'Connor, Crystal Rich, and Katie Sullivan.

Academics
The school day at Londonderry High School is divided up into eight 47 minute periods (A-H). Classes begin at 7:20am and end at 2:14pm. The school offers many different accelerated programs, such as Project Running Start, which helps students transition into tertiary education or careers. AP and Honors credit are offered as well, which are weighted into a student's GPA.

Outcomes and reputation 
, the school had a graduation rate of 95percent, well above the state median. Students tested in the top 20percent for the state in reading and the top 30percent in math.

Athletics

Londonderry High School has 36 different athletic teams, ranging from the varsity level to freshman teams, and covering three sports seasons: fall, winter and spring.

Baseball
Londonderry High School's varsity baseball team won its sixth state championship in 2019. The team is coached by Brent Demas.

Cross country
Londonderry High School's boys cross country team has won more New England titles than any other team in the state. They are best known for their 1990-1999 campaign "Team of the 90's" with top runner John Mortimer who was ranked No.1 nationally in high school cross country.

Track and field
Londonderry High School's boys track and field team has totaled over 25 state Class L titles, indoor & outdoor, since the program was initiated in the 1980s. The program has produced four All-Americans and sent numerous athletes to NCAA Division I sports programs. Steve Carroll of the class of 2009 holds the state record in the 400 meter dash.

Soccer
Londonderry High School's boys varsity soccer team won Class L championships in 1990 (undefeated), 1996 and 1999.

Gymnastics
Londonderry High School's gymnastics team placed second in the state (2006–07) and then beat the state champions, Salem High School, in the New England Regionals, placing fourth (Salem placing seventh). The team also won the state championship in 2015, having a slight edge over Pinkerton Academy.

Tennis
Londonderry High School tennis won the state title in 2010 and 2012. The team is coached by Bill Knee.

Hockey
The Londonderry High School ice hockey team is coached by Mike Bears.

Lacrosse
Londonderry's lacrosse program has boys' freshmen, JV, and varsity, and girls' freshmen, JV, and varsity teams.

Football
Londonderry's football program has boys' freshman, JV and varsity. The team is coached by Jim Lauzon. The program won their second D1 football title in 2021 under Lauzon, their second in 3 seasons.

Rivals
The school's major rivals are the Astros from Pinkerton Academy in Derry.

Activities

Marching band
Londonderry High School is particularly notable for its Lancer Marching Band and Colorguard, which is the second largest marching band in all of New England and the seventh largest east of the Mississippi River, consisting of 280 members.  The Lancers have gained fame through performances across the country and around the world, including four performances at the Tournament of Roses Parade in Pasadena, California. On October 21, 2016, the band was invited to perform in the 129th Tournament of Roses Parade in 2018.

The band marches in the New York St. Patrick's Day Parade annually. In 2009 they were honored with an invitation to march in Ireland's St. Patrick's Day parade but graciously declined it and performed in New York for a 14th time.  The Lancers participated in the pre-game festivities at the 2008 Summer Olympics in China when they marched on the Great Wall of China. The band has traveled to Washington, D.C. and marched in the 2009 and 2013 inauguration parades for President Barack Obama on January 20 and 21, respectively.

Notable performances:
 New York St. Patrick's Day Parade -  21 Performances
 Walt Disney World - 1988, 1996, 2001, 2006, 2013, 2015
 Orlando Citrus Parade - 2002, 2015
 Miss America Show us your Shoes Boardwalk Parade in Atlantic City, NJ. - 2002
 Washington DC St. Patrick's Day Parade - 2013

Pantene Beautiful Lengths campaign 
Londonderry High School holds an annual assembly, during which over a hundred students donate at least eight inches of their hair to Pantene Beautiful Lengths to help make wigs for cancer patients. Even after Pantene ended their campaign in 2018, Londonderry High School continues to hold an annual hair drive.

FIRST Robotics Team 1058 "The PVC Pirates" 
Londonderry High School's FIRST Robotics Competition Team 1058 began as the "Dragoons" during the 2003 FRC competition season playing "Stack Attack".  During the 2004 season, Team 1058 changed their name to the "PVC Pirates" due to their robot design resembling a sailing ship when fully deployed. This novel design is still remembered by many local FIRST Robotics alumni.  Team 1058 has been to the FIRST Championship seven times in its nineteen-year history.

In 2012, Team 1058 won the Granite State Regional Chairman's Award, the most prestigious regional award, due to the team's significant outreach efforts.
In 2014, Team 1058 won the Northeastern District Chairman's Award. In 2015, Team 1058 won the UNH District Chairman's Award.

In 2017, Team 1058 seeded first and captained the winning #1 alliance in the Archimedes division at the World Championship in St. Louis, MO, giving them the prestigious opportunity to compete alongside past world champions, and hall of fame teams on the Einstein Field. In 2019, Team 1058 won the District Chairman's Award at the UNH event after starting two FIRST LEGO League teams at the Londonderry Middle School.

Math team
The LHS math team placed first in the New Hampshire State Mathematics Competition in 1992–1993, 2006–2007, 2007–2008 and 2010–2011. The team finished 12th in the New England Mathematics Competition.  The team, then led by Coach Mike Wenger, also finished second in the Tri-State Math League for the year's competition.

Quizbowl
Londonderry has a quizbowl team that participates in the Granite State Challenge television program. The team won the championship in 1984 under the leadership of James Choquette. In the 2006–2007 season the team advanced to the semi-finals before being knocked out by Hanover. The team also competes in the New Hampshire Quiz Bowl League and in 2007 finished first among at-large teams to make the playoffs, and placed fourth out of eight teams.  The 2007-2008 team finished first in their division with a victory at their home meet. The 2021-2022 team made it to the semifinals of the state tournament.

Notable alumni
Ant, comedian
Ryan Griffin, tight end for the Chicago Bears
Alexxis Lemire, actress and model
Brian Wilson (class of 2000), former relief pitcher for the San Francisco Giants and Los Angeles Dodgers

References

External links
 Londonderry High School official website
 The Lancer Spirit Online, the website of Londonderry High School's student newspaper
 Londonderry Marching Lancers

Educational institutions established in 1978
Schools in Rockingham County, New Hampshire
Public high schools in New Hampshire
1978 establishments in New Hampshire
Londonderry, New Hampshire